Wikstroemia angustifolia is a shrub in the family Thymelaeaceae.  It is native to China, specifically western Hubei, eastern Sichuan, and southern Shanxi.

Description
The shrub is erect and broomlike and grows from 0.3 to 1.0 m tall. Its branches are slender. It is often found in forest margins, open bushlands, and in on rocks at altitudes of 100–200 m.

References

angustifolia